Cipatat railway station is a class III railway station located at Cipatat, Cipatat, West Bandung Regency, West Java, Indonesia. The station, which is located at an altitude of +387 m, is included in the Operation Area II Bandung. The station reopened on 21 September 2020, as part of the continuing rehabilitation of the Manggarai–Padalarang line.

Services 
The following is a list of train services at the Cipatat Station.

Passenger services
 Economy class
 Siliwangi, towards

References

External links
 

West Bandung Regency
Railway stations in West Java
Railway stations opened in 1884